The 1943 Saint Mary's Pre-Flight Air Devils football team was an American football team that represented the United States Navy pre-flight school at Saint Mary's College of California during the 1943 college football season. The team compiled a 3–4–1 record. Spike Nelson was the head coach. The team included 1941 Heisman Trophy winner Bruce Smith.

Schedule

References

St. Mary's Pre-Flight
Saint Mary's Pre-Flight Air Devils football seasons
Saint Mary's Pre-Flight Air Devils football